The Nabi Saeen Mosque (Masjid al-Nabi Saʿīn; , Misgad Navi Sa'in) is a mosque located on Nabi Saeen Hill in Nazareth, Israel, at a height of  above sea level. The mosque is located at the top of the ridge enclosing the city from the north, about 150 meters north of the Salesian Basilica of Jesus the Adolescent, providing a panoramic view of Nazareth and the Jezreel Valley to the south, and the Upper Galilee and Haifa outskirts (Krayot) to the north and west.

Name
The mosque is named for the hill on which it sits, which is officially romanized Nabi Saeen on local signs. It has also been variously rendered as En Nabi Sa'id, Neby Sȧîn, Neby Sain, and Mt Oaber Simani. It is apparently a local corruption of Isaiah, normally rendered Isha'ya' in Arabic.

Architecture

The mosque is a two-story structure in the shape of a trapezoid and is 20 meters long and 20 meters wide at its base. Near the northern front facing the street stands an octagonal minaret balcony where four windows surround the high tower, a spire in sharp gray. The front of the second floor is painted in bright green, and has the form of five arches over windows, each a small circular window (similar style windows surround the second floor on all sides). The entire facade is divided into seven parts, including seven separate pairs of narrow columns painted green on the first floor, 

The first floor entrance leads into an open corridor on the other side, stretching along the western facade of the building.

References

Mosques in Nazareth
Mosque buildings with domes